ITG  may refer to:

Organizations
 Iraqi Transitional Government (2005–2006), former ruling institution of Iraq
 International Trumpet Guild, trumpet players' organization
 Investment Technology Group, American firm
 In the Game Trading Cards, a manufacturer of hockey trading cards
 Institute of Tourist Guiding, UK's official tourist body
 Irish Traction Group, Irish railway preservation society
 ITG Brands, the US subsidiary of Imperial Tobacco Group

Science and technology
 Integrin, a type of membrane protein
 Inferior temporal gyrus, a region of the brain
 IT governance

Other uses
 In The Groove (video game), a music video game

See also
 Interconnector Turkey–Greece–Italy (ITGI), a natural gas pipeline